"Colin the Caterpillar" is a chocolate roll cake sold by the British retailer Marks & Spencer. More than 15 million Colin the Caterpillar cakes have been sold since it was introduced in 1990.

Overview
Colin the Caterpillar is a chocolate sponge roll cake filled with chocolate buttercream and covered in a milk chocolate shell, with sugar-coated milk chocolate beans for decoration. The cake has a decorative face and feet made of white chocolate. The dessert is available in large and small sizes.

According to Marks and Spencer, it takes 38 people to assemble each cake from start to finish, and 8.4 tonnes (8,400 kg) of sugar coating are used each year for the decorative spots.

Initial success for sales of the cake has been attributed to the ongoing popularity of Eric Carle's children's picture book The Very Hungry Caterpillar, and that a bestselling cookbook by Jane Asher, published the same year that the cake launched, also featured a recipe for a caterpillar birthday cake. However, Colin the Caterpillar has since become a staple of children's birthday parties, but is also popular with teens and adults.

In 2020, Marks & Spencer marked the cake's 30th anniversary by declaring Colin's Birthday, Wednesday 26 August, as National Colin the Caterpillar Day.

Variations
Over the years, there have been several seasonal and limited edition variations on the original Colin the Caterpillar cake:

 Colin the Caterpillar Cake
 Connie the Caterpillar Cake – A female version of the original Colin cake, wearing a pink bow
 Personalised Cake – As part of its "Food to Order" offering, Marks & Spencer offers giant versions of the Colin and Connie cakes. The larger sized cakes can serve up to 40 people, and are also personalisable, with a space for a name and the exact occasion being celebrated piped on.
 Wedding Cakes – In 2017, Marks & Spencer launched a Colin the Caterpillar wedding cake range. The range features 2 cakes, the first called "Colin the Groom" is a larger than standard Colin cake (weighing just over 2 kg) with the face featuring a bow tie and top hat. The bridal version – named Connie the Bride – features a lace veil, confetti and a flower posy and also weighs just over 2 kg. Each cake currently costs £10-£15.
 25th Anniversary Cake – In August 2015, Marks & Spencer marked the 25th anniversary of the dessert with a limited edition "Colin the Caterpillar" featuring a party hat and multicoloured feet, and additional candy spots.
 Count Colin the Caterpillar Cake – For Hallowe'en, Marks & Spencer launched a Count Colin cake. The colouring of Colin's face and feet changes from white to green, and his body is decorated with chocolate maggots. It is said to resemble either Frankenstein's monster or a zombie.
 Christmas Cake – For Christmas, a festive version of Colin the Caterpillar cake is produced. Colin wears a Santa hat, and his body is adorned with a range of festive decorations, including candy canes, holly leaves and snowflakes.
 Coffee Morning Colin – In 2018, Marks & Spencer launched a limited edition Colin Cake for Macmillan Cancer Support's World's Biggest Coffee Morning. Colin's feet were changed to purple, and his body was covered in green and purple sprinkles, instead of the usual multi-coloured ones. Marks & Spencer donated 10% of sales to Macmillan Cancer Support after purchasing.  
 Count Colin Gummies – For Hallowe'en, Marks & Spencer sold packets of maggot gummies, similar to the maggots on the body of the Count Colin cake
 Colin the Caterpillar Faces - In 2020, to mark the 30th Anniversary of the Colin the Caterpillar cake, Marks & Spencer began selling bags of Colin the Caterpillar faces. The snacks have white chocolate faces and milk chocolate eyes, just like the one that come on the cake.
 Mini Colin the Caterpillars – Miniature milk chocolate-coated chocolate sponge rolls, filled with chocolate buttercream. Decorated with milk chocolate beans and a white chocolate face.
 Flower Power Connie – A redesigned version of Connie the Caterpillar, decorated yellow and pink flowers and a sporting a floral headband, released in 2021 for Mother's Day
 Easter Eggs – For Easter 2021, M&S launched a series of Colin the Caterpillar themed Easter Products. This included a hollow milk chocolate Easter Egg, containing a bag of Colin the Caterpillar faces, and a re-designed Colin the Caterpillar cake, which featured Colin wearing a top hat with mini bunny ear and chocolate eggs along his back.
 Colin the Caterpillar Cake Jars – In April 2021, M&S launched a series of cakes in jars, which featured raspberry ripple and trillionaire's cake, as well as a Colin The Caterpillar cake version. The Colin The Caterpillar jar featured layers of chocolate sponge with Belgian chocolate sauce, chocolate ganache, milk and white choc chips and was topped with Colin's white chocolate face.

Other retailers

Similar caterpillar cakes are available in other rival retailers. This includes Morris the Caterpillar from Morrisons, Cuthbert the Caterpillar from Aldi, Charlie the Caterpillar at the Co-Op, Cecil the Caterpillar at Waitrose, Clyde the Caterpillar at Asda, Wiggles the Caterpillar at Sainsbury's, Clive the Caterpillar at One Stop and Curly the Caterpillar at Tesco. Gluten and milk free versions are also available; Carl the caterpillar from Tesco, Frieda the caterpillar from Asda, and Eric the caterpillar from Sainsbury’s. 

In April 2021, Marks & Spencer announced that it had lodged an intellectual property claim for infringement of three trade marks with the High Court against Aldi in relation to the latter's Cuthbert the Caterpillar product. In its complaint, Marks & Spencer claimed that Aldi's Cuthbert the Caterpillar was too similar to the Colin the Caterpillar cake, which could lead consumers to believe that they are of the same standard and allows Cuthbert to "ride on the coat-tails" of the M&S cake's reputation. In February 2022, the lawsuit was settled between both parties for an undisclosed amount.

In reaction to the media generated around the court case Papa's Fish and Chips, a fish and chip shop in Cleethorpes, began selling deep-fried Mini Colin the Caterpillar cakes. Profits from the sales were used to raise funds for the Teenage Cancer Trust.  Emanuel's, a fish and chip shop in East Kilbride, later gained media attention for selling a full-sized Colin the Caterpillar cake that had been deep-fried in batter.

See also
 Percy Pig
 List of Marks & Spencer brands
 List of cakes
 Fudgie the Whale

References

External links
 Colin the Caterpillar at MarksAndSpencer.com

Chocolate desserts
British cakes
Marks & Spencer
Fictional butterflies and moths